Bomb Hugger is a painting by graffiti artist Banksy in 2003. In 2007, it sold for £31,200 at Sotheby's.

References

Works by Banksy
2003 paintings